Wrenn is a surname and a given name.

Surname 
Notable people with the include:
 Charles Leslie Wrenn (1895–1969), British scholar
 George Wrenn (1865–1948), American tennis player
 Heaton Wrenn  (1900–78), American rugby union player
 Ralph Wrenn (died 1692), English naval officer
 Robert Wrenn (1873–1925), American tennis player
 Robert Wrenn (golfer) (born 1959), American sportscaster and golf course design consultant

First name 

 Wrenn Schmidt, an American actor.

See also
 Wren (disambiguation)
 G & R Wrenn, model makers